PFC Brestnik 1948 (Брестник 1948) is a Bulgarian football club from the small neighborhood of Brestnik, located in the Greater Plovdiv area. The club will play its home matches at the Berkut Stadium, which is undergoing construction. The team currently plays in the B PFG - the second division of Bulgarian football. Brestnik's best season in the second division was in the 2009/2010 season - sixth place.

Honours
South-East V AFG
Champions: 2008-09
 Sixth place in the East "B" group: 2009/10
 1/16 finalist for the National Cup tournament: this time its official name is the Cup of Bulgaria - 2009 / '10

History
Brestnik 1948 was founded in 1948. During the whole history the team was competing in the amateur football and was a stepping-stone for the young football players that have left the schools of professional clubs in Plovdiv. At different periods of time, the team outfit was put on by Ayan Sadakov, Georgi Ivanov-Gonzo, Dimitar Telkiyski, Veselin Tosev and others. During season 2002-2003, the team won 1st place in „А” regional group - Plovdiv (the fourth division of Bulgarian football) and for the first time in its history entered in the third division. During the 2008-2009 season, the team took first place in the third division and  qualified for the B PFG for the upcoming season.

Current squad
As of August 25, 2011

League positions

External links 
 
 60 years PFC Brestnik 1948
 

Association football clubs established in 1948
Football clubs in Bulgaria
1948 establishments in Bulgaria